Hsianwenia wui is an extinct species of cyprinid fish of the family Cyprinidae from the Pliocene lake deposits of the Qaidam inland basin on the northern Tibetan Plateau.

Taxonomy
This species is characterised by hypercalcified ribs, which occupy almost the entire body of the fish. The fish seemed to live in a hyper saline environment and the thick costal skeleton may have been an adaptation to this habitat. The excess salts absorbed by the fish being deposited in its bones throughout its life and leading to the thickened skeleton. It is named in honor of Professor W.U. Hsianwen (19001985), one of the founders of freshwater fish research in China.

References

Fish described in 2008
Prehistoric ray-finned fish genera
Pliocene fish
Neogene fish of Asia